Owltan (also Romanized as Owltān and Ūltān) is a village in Owltan Rural District of the Central District of Parsabad County, Ardabil province, Iran. At the 2006 census, its population was 3,610 in 810 households, when it was a village within the former Qeshlaq-e Shomali Rural District. The following census in 2011 counted 3,991 people in 1,037 households. The latest census in 2016 showed a population of 3,622 people in 990 households; it was the largest village in the new rural district of Owltan.

References 

Parsabad County

Towns and villages in Parsabad County

Populated places in Ardabil Province

Populated places in Parsabad County